Niederursel is a quarter of Frankfurt am Main, Germany. It is part of the Ortsbezirk Nord-West and is subdivided into the Stadtbezirke Niederursel-Ost and Niederursel-West.

References

Districts of Frankfurt